Cosmos ULM (Ultra Léger Motorisé), also called Cosmos Ultralight SA de CV, is an ultralight trike aircraft manufacturer that was originally based in Fontaine-lès-Dijon, France. Its aircraft are supplied as factory completed aircraft and are not available as kits.

The company went bankrupt in the late 2000s and was reformed as Cosmos Ultralight in Puente de Ixtla, Mexico.

Aircraft

References

External links

Aircraft manufacturers of France
Aircraft manufacturers of Mexico
Ultralight trikes
Companies based in Bourgogne-Franche-Comté